Cutoff period is a term in finance. In capital budgeting, it is the period (usually in years) below which a project's payback period must fall in order to accept the project.
Generally it is the time period in which a project gives its investment back if a project fails to do so the project will be rejected.

For example a project has the following inflows
years              Inflows respectively
1                   100,000
2                   150,000   
3                   200,000

If the project's payback is 2 years having an outflow of 250,000 the cut off period must be 2 years otherwise the project will be rejected.
Capital budgeting